Mission Control is the second full-length album by Athens, Georgia-based garage rock band The Whigs. It was released on January 22, 2008, by ATO Records, on CD and vinyl simultaneously.

Track listing
All songs written by Parker Gispert.
"Like a Vibration" – 2:36
"Production City" – 3:01
"I Never Want to Go Home" – 2:49
"Right Hand on My Heart" – 4:14
"Sleep Sunshine" – 4:26
"1000 Wives" – 3:10
"Hot Bed" – 3:05
"Already Young" – 3:18
"I Got Ideas" – 3:25
"Need You Need You" – 2:44
"Mission Control" – 4:33

The Whigs (band) albums
2008 albums
Albums produced by Rob Schnapf